Anjali Pendharker (born 3 April 1964 in Bhir, Maharashtra) is a former Test and One Day International cricketer who represented India. She played a total of five Tests and 19 ODIs.

References

Living people
1959 births
People from Maharashtra
Indian women cricketers
India women One Day International cricketers
India women Test cricketers
People from Beed
People from Marathwada